was a Japanese stage and film actress. She appeared in more than 60 films from 1936 to 1967.

Career
Graduating from the girls' school at Gakushuin, she married a businessman in 1909 and spent eight years in Moscow. In 1925, at the age of 35, she decided to become an actress and began training at the Tsukiji Shōgekijō. She appeared in many stage productions, most famously as Madame Ranevskaya in The Cherry Orchard. She also appeared in films, including Tokyo Story, which was voted the best film of all time in a poll of film directors by Sight & Sound magazine.

Selected filmography

Honours 
Medal with Purple Ribbon (1956)
Order of the Precious Crown, 4th Class, Wisteria (1965)
Person of Cultural Merit (1966)
Order of the Precious Crown, 3rd class, Butterfly (1974)

References

External links

 

1890 births
1980 deaths
People from Chiba (city)
Japanese film actresses
Japanese stage actresses
Recipients of the Medal with Purple Ribbon
Persons of Cultural Merit